Francisco de Borja (1441–1511) was a Spanish cardinal.

Francisco de Borja may also refer to:

People
Francisco Galcerán de Lloris y de Borja (1470–1506), Catalan cardinal
Francis Borgia (1510–1572), duke of Gandia and Catholic saint
Francisco de Borja y Aragón (1581–1658), viceroy of Peru
 (1629–1689), bishop of Tucumán and Trujillo
 (1733–1808), Captain general of the Spanish Navy
Francisco de Borja Álvarez de Toledo, 12th Marquis of Villafranca (1763–1821)
 (1789–1869), Argentine judge and legislator
 (1807–1891), Chilean politician and Minister of Finance
Francisco de Borja Queipo de Llano, 8th Count of Toreno (1840–1890), Spanish historian and politician
Francisco de Borja Echeverría (1848–1904), Chilean Conservative Party deputy and diplomat
 (1851–1929), Chilean politician and Minister of Public Works
Francisco de Borja Valenzuela Ríos (1917–1998), Chilean bishop
Francisco de Borja-Pérez Peñas (born 1982), Spanish footballer

Places
San Francisco de Borja Municipality, Chihuahua, Mexico
San Francisco de Borja, seat of San Francisco de Borja Municipality